Bygland Church is a parish church of the Church of Norway in Bygland Municipality in Agder county, Norway. It is located in the village of Bygland on the eastern shore of the Byglandsfjorden, just alongside the Norwegian National Road 9. It is one of the churches for the Bygland og Årdal parish which is part of the Otredal prosti (deanery) in the Diocese of Agder og Telemark. The white, wooden church was built in a cruciform design in 1838 by the builder Anders Thorsen Syrtveit who used plans drawn up by the famous architect Hans Linstow. The church seats about 250 people.

History
The earliest existing historical records of the church date back to the year 1316, but the church was not new that year. In 1669, the old stave church was torn down and replaced with a new building. Not much is known about that building.

In 1814, this church served as an election church. Together with more than 300 other parish churches across Norway, it was a polling station for elections to the 1814 Norwegian Constituent Assembly which wrote the Constitution of Norway. This was Norway's first national elections. Each church parish was a constituency that elected people called "electors" who later met together in each county to elect the representatives for the assembly that was to meet in Eidsvoll later that year.

In 1838, the church building was torn down and a new cruciform building was constructed on the same site. The new church was consecrated on 18 November 1838 by the local provost, Ole Berg, from Evje Church.

Media gallery

See also
List of churches in Agder og Telemark

References

Bygland
Churches in Agder
Wooden churches in Norway
Cruciform churches in Norway
19th-century Church of Norway church buildings
Churches completed in 1838
1838 establishments in Norway
Norwegian election church